is major district of Shibuya-ku in Tokyo, Japan.  It was developed on the site of a former brewery and is now home to Yebisu Garden Place. It has a high concentration of bars and restaurants.

Geography and transportation

Ebisu is a major district and neighborhood of the Special Ward of Shibuya-ku.  It is located south of Shibuya and north of Meguro.

Ebisu is accessed by the JR Yamanote Line and Tokyo Metro Hibiya Line via Ebisu Station.

History

Ebisu was founded around 1928 as a community developed around the Japan Beer Brewery Company (now Sapporo Breweries Limited) facilities which began brewing Yebisu Beer in 1890.

After the breweries were moved to Chiba in 1988, the area underwent a major urban development resulting in the construction of Yebisu Garden Place, which opened to the public in 1994.  Following the construction of Yebisu Garden Place in 1994, the area around Ebisu Station developed rapidly.

The district and railway station of Ebisu takes its name from the Yebisu Beer brand, which in turn was named after Ebisu (one of the Japanese Seven Gods of Fortune).  The spelling "Yebisu" is intentionally archaic. With or without the "y" the pronunciation is the same as "Ebisu".

Sightseeing and attractions

Food and drink
Ebisu has a high concentration of restaurants, cafés, izakaya, ramen shops, bars and old-fashioned tachinomi ("stand and drink") bars.

Yebisu Garden Place

Yebisu Garden Place is a shopping and cultural center located in Ebisu. It has a sloped promenade leading to a large central plaza covered by a wide glass arch.  The area regularly hosts events and markets on weekends.

It is accessible via the Ebisu Skywalk (a fast-moving covered walkway) from JR Ebisu Station East Exit, which takes approximately 5 minutes on foot.

The complex contains the following attractions:
 Sapporo Breweries headquarters;
 Museum of Yebisu Beer;
 Tokyo Metropolitan Museum of Photography;
 Château Restaurant Joël Robuchon, a replica of a Louis XVI French château which houses three Michelin-starred restaurants (L'Atelier de Joël Robuchon - 2 stars, La Table de Joël Robuchon - 2 stars, and Le Chateau de Joël Robuchon - 3 stars);
 Yebisu Garden Place Tower, a skyscraper with "sky dining" restaurants on the top 38th and 39th floors with panoramic views over Tokyo;
 Atre shopping arcade;
 Glass Square, a self-enclosed shopping centre; and
 Mitsukoshi department store.

Yebisu Garden Place also offers annual winter illumination. It is one of the most popular winter illumination events in Tokyo which has been held for over 20 years. It contains over 100,000 LED lights and a Baccarat crystal chandelier that is 5m large x 3m wide "It’s the world biggest Baccarat chandelier created with 8,472 pieces of crystal parts and 250 lights by 70 skilled craftsmen." This is one of the most romantic attractions and it is perfect for couples usually from November 3 to December 25.

Businesses

The publication The Diplomat has its headquarters in the Ebisu MF Building.

Education
 operates public elementary and junior high schools.

Ebisu 4-chome, 1-chome 11-12, 20-26, and 32-35 ban, 2-chome 9-10 ban, and 3-chome 1, 4-42, 44, and 46-49-ban are zoned to Kakezuka Elementary School (加計塚小学校). Ebisu 1-chome 29-31 ban, 2-chome 1-8 ban and 11-39 ban, and 3-chome 2-3, 43, and 45-ban are zoned to Rinsen Elementary School (臨川小学校). Ebisu 1-chome 1-10, 13-19, and 27-28 ban are zoned to Hiroo Elementary School (広尾小学校).  All of Ebisu (1-4 chome) is zoned to Hiroo Junior High School (広尾中学校).

References

External links

 

Neighborhoods of Tokyo
Districts of Shibuya